Tammneeme is a village in Viimsi Parish, Harju County in northern Estonia. As of 2011 Census, the settlement's population was 463.

Tammneeme was first mentioned in 1491 as Iversback. During the Middle Ages Tammneeme was settled by Coastal Swedes and belonged under the Maardu Manor. In the beginning of 16th century the first Estonians started to settle in and slowly they got predominating. Most of today's housing was built in the 1960s–1970s.

Composer and musician  (1922–1995) was born in Tammneeme.

Gallery

References

Villages in Harju County
Kreis Harrien